The 1999 Poolrite GTP Bathurst Showroom Showdown was an endurance race for GT Production Cars.
The event was staged at the Mount Panorama Circuit, Bathurst, New South Wales on 13 November 1999 over a three-hour duration.

The race was won by Terry Bosnjak and Mark Williamson driving a Mazda RX-7 SP Turbo.

Class structure
The field was divided into the following six classes:
 Class A : Super Cars under $300,000
 Class B : High Performance Cars & Sports Cars under $89,000 (Including Turbocharged All Wheel Drive)
 Class C : Production Touring Cars under 5000cc, Two Wheel Drive & under $47,000
 Class D : Production Touring Cars under 2500cc, Front Wheel Drive & under $37,000
 Class E : Production Touring Cars under 1850cc, Front Wheel Drive & under $26,000
 Class S : Sports, Performance Cars under 2600cc and under $63,000

Results

References

External links
 Bathurst Update and Entry List, www.motorsport.com, as archived at web.archive.org
 Mt. Panorama 1999 FAI Bathurst 1000 Preview, www.motorsport.com, as archived at web.archive.org
 Poolrite 3-Hour Bathurst Showroom Showdown Results, au.motorsport.com
 Image of the winning Mazda RX-7, autopics.com.au
 Image of Stoupas/D’Agostin (Porsche) and Bosnjak/Williamson (Mazda), www.christiandagostin.com, as archived at web.archive.org

Motorsport in Bathurst, New South Wales
Poolrite